Psychomagia is the second album by Abraxas, led by Shanir Ezra Blumenkranz, performing compositions written by John Zorn, which was recorded in December 2013 and released on the Tzadik label.

Reception

Martin Schray stated "these tracks are true Zorn compositions interwoven with Near Eastern melodies, western soundscapes and jazzy wackiness and Abraxas play these pieces with the abrasive, breathtaking energy of a monstrous jam session. The musicians never consider technical skills as ends in themselves, they always serve the compositions. Psychomagia is a High Mass for guitar freaks, fans of the music of Frank Zappa and for those who like the harsher sides of Bill Frisell and Marc Ribot". New York Music Daily stated "On one hand, this album is so tuneful that fans of traditional surf music are going to love it; at the same time, it’s so deliciously evil in places that the most cynical Yo La Tengo diehards might be caught drooling".

Track listing 
All compositions by John Zorn
 "Metapsychomagia" - 7:31  
 "Sacred Emblems" - 3:02  
 "Circe" - 6:03  
 "Squaring the Circle" - 5:51  
 "Celestial Mechanism" - 2:32  
 "Evocation of the Triumphant Beast" - 6:25  
 "Four Rivers" - 3:54  
 "The Nameless God" - 4:35  
 "Anima Mundi" - 4:14

Personnel 
Shanir Ezra Blumenkranz - bass
Aram Bajakian, Eyal Maoz - guitar 
Kenny Grohowski - drums

References 

2014 albums
Albums produced by John Zorn
Tzadik Records albums